Obsidian: Literature & Arts in the African Diaspora (sometimes referred to as Obsidian, Obsidian Lit or Obsidian: Literature and Arts in the African Diaspora) is an African-American peer-reviewed critical journal which was first published in 1975 by Alvin Aubert at SUNY (Fredonia) under the name Obsidian: Black Literature in Review. Obsidian has undergone a number of name changes and publication venues over the years and, in 2014, editor Duriel E. Harris changed the name to Obsidian: Literature & Arts in the African Diaspora. The journal is published two times per year through the Publications Unit at Illinois State University.

History 

The journal was established through use of Alvin Aubert's own funds and those of various benefactors. Since that time, Obsidian has published continuously through financial contributions from individuals, support from various educational institutions, and organizations including the National Endowment of the Arts (NEA). Obsidian is a leading publisher of new and established, emerging and contemporary work by artists across the African Diaspora in artistic disciplines including literature, visual, sound and mixed media. Contributors who have achieved notable success include Octavia Butler, Stacey Robinson, Claudia Rankine, Sheree Renée Thomas, Terrance Hayes, Davida Ingram, Aldon Lynn Nielsen, Wura-Natasha Ogunji.

Current masthead 
Duriel E. Harris Editor in Chief

Sheree Renée Thomas Associate Editor

Tara A. Reeser Managing Editor

Marva Jackson Lord Web Editor

Amanda Fain Technical Editor

Amber Laquet Editorial Assistant

Editorial Board 
Duane Boutté, Drama & Performance Art; Tisa Bryant, Fiction & Hybrid Genre; Nicole Carr, Fiction; Nandi Comer, Poetry; LaTasha N. Nevada Diggs, Digital Media; Krista Franklin, Visual Art; Kermit Frazier, Drama; Danian Jerry, Fiction; Meta DuEwa Jones, Criticism;

John Keene, Fiction & Hybrid Genre; Keith Leonard, Criticism; Danielle Littlefield, Fiction; Khanyisile Mbongwa, Visual Arts; Lenard D. Moore, Poetry; Opal Moore, Fiction; Keith Obadike, Digital Media; Rone Shavers, Fiction & Hybrid Genre; Paul Ugor, Criticism & Drama; Tyrone Williams, Poetry; Keith Wilson, Digital Media

Advisory and contributing editors 

L. Rosanne M. Adderley, Lillian Allen, Houston A. Baker, Jr.,  Jean-Pierre Bekolo, Kwame Dawes, Madhu Dubey, Isra El-beshir, Sally Ann Ferguson, Charlene Gilbert, Clifford E. Griffin, Tracie D. Hall, Erica Hunt, Tayari Jones, Douglas Kearney, Yakini B. Kemp, Shelia Smith McKoy, T. Urayoán Noel, Sterling D. Plumpp, Tomeka Reid, giovanni singleton, Nancy D. Tolson, Afaa Michael Weaver, Richard Yarborough

Former editors emeriti 
Alvin Aubert, Gerald Barrax, Afaa Michael Weaver, Doris Laryea, Joyce Pettis, Thomas Lisk, and Sheila Smith McKoy

Awards 
Obsidian won the Parnassus Award for Significant Editorial Achievement in 2018 for Obsidian Volume 42, Speculating Futures: Black Imagination & the Arts (Duriel E. Harris, Editor, Sheree Renée Thomas, Guest Editor, Nisi Shawl, Associate Guest Editor, Fiction, Isiah Lavender III, Associate Guest Editor, Criticism, Krista Franklin, Associate Guest Editor, Visual Art).

In February 2021, Obsidian was approved for an NEA Grants for Arts Projects (GAP) award to support outreach to Historically Black Colleges and Universities (HBCUs) and publication. 'With the aim of growing its readership and cultivating new voices, Obsidian plans to offer online literary programming at HBCUs' across the United States.

Obsidian is one of the Community of Literary Magazines and Presses (CLMP) 2021 grant recipients of the Literary Magazine Fund, launched in 2019 with The Amazon Literary Partnership.

References

External links 
 www.obsidianlit.org

University of Illinois Press academic journals
Biannual journals